Agulla is a genus of modern snakeflies in the family Raphidiidae.

Agulla species are predatory, both as adults and larvae. They occur in North America in British Columbia and in the Western United States, namely in the Rocky Mountains and westward, including the southwestern deserts.

Systematics
At present 31 living and two extinct species of Agulla are known from North America. The species are divided into four subgenera, with the two extinct (†) species left unplaced in the genus.

Agulla
Subgenus Agulla
 A. (A.) arazonia (Banks)
 A. (A.) amaudi (Aspöck)
 A. (A.) assimilis (Albarda)
 A. (A.) astuta (Banks)
 A. (A.) barri (Aspöck)
 A. (A.) bicolor (Albarda)
 A. (A.) bractea Carpenter
 A. (A.) crotchi (Banks)
 A. (A.) faulkneri Aspöck
 A. (A.) flexa Carpenter
 A. (A.) herbsti (Ebsen-Peterson
 A. (A.) Agulla nixa
Subgenus Galavia
 A. (G.) adnixa (Hagen) 
 A. (G.) modesta Carpenter
 A. (G.) paramerica Aspöck
 A. (G.) unicolor Carpenter
Subgenus Franciscoraphidia
 A. (F.) directa Carpenter
Subgenus Californoraphidia
 A. (C.) nigrinotum Woglum & McGregor
Subgenus incertae sedis
 †A. mineralensis (Miocene, Stewart Valley, Nevada, USA)
 †A. protomaculata (Lutetian, Green River Formation, Colorado, USA)

References

Raphidioptera
Insects of North America
Taxa named by Anton Handlirsch
Insect genera